Solly Tshepiso Msimanga (born 16 July 1980) is a South African politician serving as the Leader of the Opposition in the Gauteng Provincial Legislature since May 2019. He has been a Member of the Gauteng Provincial Legislature since February 2019, having previously served from 2014 to 2016. Msimanga was the Executive Mayor of the City of Tshwane Metropolitan Municipality from 2016 to 2019 and the DA Provincial Chairperson from 2014 to 2017. He was the Democratic Alliance's Gauteng Premier candidate for the 2019 elections.

Early life, education and family

Solly Tshepiso Msimanga was born in Atteridgeville, a township west of Pretoria. He attended Isaac Moré Primary School, Patogeng Higher Primary and Saulridge High School. He obtained a national diploma in marketing management and a BCompt from the University of Pretoria.

Career
Msimanga worked with Project Literacy and was enlisted at the Liberian embassy at one stage. Later on, he was employed by the United States embassy. He had been a national director for Legal Education And Development. He also held multiple senior management positions in the private sector.

Entry into politics

Msimanga first joined the DA in 2006. After having attended a DA event, he wrote to the party criticising its campaign approach and was soon offered a staff position by the party's CEO Ryan Coetzee.

He eventually began rising through the ranks of the party. In May 2011, he was elected to the Tshwane City Council, and in the same year, he became the leader of the DA's Gauteng North region.

In May 2014, Msimanga was elected as a Member of the Gauteng Provincial Legislature. He was appointed the party's provincial spokesperson for sports and served on the Education and Economic Development Portfolio Committees in the legislature.

DA leadership elections
In November 2014, he succeeded Michael Moriarty as DA Provincial Chairperson, after Moriarty had stood down.

In November 2017, Moriarty succeeded Msimanga as DA Provincial Chairperson at the party's Provincial Congress, after Msimanga took the decision to not run for re-election.

In March 2018, Msimanga declared himself a candidate for the position of Federal Chairperson of the Democratic Alliance ahead of the party's Federal Congress. On 8 April 2018, he lost to incumbent Athol Trollip.

Mayoral career

In September 2015, Msimanga was announced as the DA's mayoral candidate for the City of Tshwane in the 2016 municipal elections. He defeated Brandon Topham and Bronwyn Engelbrecht for the nomination. The DA emerged as the largest party after the election, but without a majority. By forming a coalition with several smaller parties, and with the support of the Economic Freedom Fighters, Msimanga was elected unopposed as the Executive Mayor of Tshwane. He was the first DA member to hold the post.

When he was elected Mayor, he stated his intention to outlaw blue-lights brigades in the City — for everyone except the President. “The only VIPs in the City will be the residents of the City,” he said.

In May 2018, it was revealed that Msimanga's chief of staff Marietha Aucamp had been dishonest about her qualifications. She was placed on special leave on 16 May 2018. She subsequently resigned on 17 May 2018. In June 2018, an inquiry found that she had misrepresented her qualifications. It also found that her appointment was unlawful.

In August 2018, both the Economic Freedom Fighters (EFF) and African National Congress (ANC) had tabled motions of no confidence to remove Msimanga as Mayor.  On 30 August 2018, Tshwane Council Speaker Katlego Mathebe declined to proceed with the EFF's motion of no confidence because it did not comply with the council's rules. The EFF subsequently staged a walkout out of the council chamber. The party's caucus leader said that it would not support the ANC's motion. Due to the lack of support, the ANC withdrew its motion.

On 27 September 2018, he survived another motion of no confidence tabled by the ANC. The EFF abstained from voting. Ninety-five councillors voted against the motion, while seventy-seven voted for it. Twenty-one councillors abstained.

Msimanga's last months as Mayor were overshadowed by the irregular awarding of a multi-billion-rand tender contract to GladAfrica by embattled City Manager Moeketsi Mosola. Msimanga tried to suspend Mosola, and the DA caucus of the Tshwane City Council attempted multiple times to remove Mosola from the position. Mosola announced in July 2019 that he would step down as the City Manager of Tshwane.

On 18 January 2019, Msimanga announced that he was stepping down as Mayor of Tshwane to focus on his Gauteng premiership campaign. He also said that his resignation would be finalised in the first two weeks of February. He later announced on 31 January 2019 that he would effectively resign on 11 February 2019. Msimanga was succeeded by Stevens Mokgalapa. Msimanga was subsequently sworn in as a Member of the Gauteng Provincial Legislature.

Gauteng premiership campaign
On 19 August 2018, Msimanga was announced as the party's Gauteng Premier candidate for the 2019 general elections. He defeated many prominent candidates for the nomination, such as Member of the Gauteng Provincial Legislature Makashule Gana, Member of Parliament Ghaleb Cachalia, and Party Spokesperson Refiloe Nt’sheke.

On 8 May 2019, the African National Congress narrowly retained their majority in the Gauteng Provincial Legislature with a total of 50.19% of the vote. The Democratic Alliance remained the official opposition, but lost three seats, giving them a total of twenty seats in the provincial legislature. Msimanga was elected DA caucus leader on 17 May 2019 and officially assumed the post of Leader of the Opposition on 22 May 2019.

Provincial leadership
Msimanga was selected as the party's acting provincial leader on 2 September 2020, after incumbent John Moodey had resigned from the party. He ran for a full term at the party's provincial congress in November and defeated party veteran James Lorimer in a landslide of 75% against Lorimer's 25%.

Personal life
He married Monde Msimanga in 2006. They have two children named Amogelong and Aobokwe. Solly and his wife work together on the charity organisation named “Make Somebody’s Christmas a Merry One”. The project donates groceries to disadvantaged families.

Sexual harassment allegation
In October 2020, DA MPL Nkele Molapo filed a sexual harassment case against Msimanga. Msimanga denies the allegation and says that he is willing to take a lie detector test to prove his innocence. He has also responded by opening a crimen injuria case against Molapo.

2021 assault 
On 6 May 2021, Msimanga was assaulted by an unidentified man while visiting his cousin in Benoni, Gauteng. The man was a business partner of Msimanga's cousin and claimed that Msimanga owed him R1,4 million. The man later apologised and said that it was a "misunderstanding" and that no money is owed. The DA welcomed the man's arrest.

References

External links

 People's Assembly profile
 Profile on Twitter

|-

1980 births
Living people
Democratic Alliance (South Africa) politicians
University of Pretoria alumni
Members of the Gauteng Provincial Legislature
Mayors of Pretoria